NGC 811 is an object in the New General Catalogue. It is an elliptical galaxy located in the constellation Cetus about 700 million light-years from the Milky Way. It was discovered by the American astronomer Francis Leavenworth in 1886. However, it is usually misidentified as a different object, the spiral galaxy PGC 7905.

See also 
 List of NGC objects (1–1000)

References

External links 
 

0811
Elliptical galaxies
Cetus (constellation)
007870